Contee may refer to:

 "Conteé", a poem from the 1978 book Babel by Patti Smith
 Benjamin Contee (1755–1815), American Episcopal priest and statesman
 Cheryl Contee, American entrepreneur, CEO, blogger, and writer
 Thomas Contee (1729–1811), American militia man, politician, planter

See also
 SS Benjamin Contee, 1942 American Liberty Ship